The Billboard Music Award winners for Top Country Song. Notable winners include Wynonna Judd, Taylor Swift, Florida Georgia Line, and Thomas Rhett.

Winners and nominees

Superlatives

Win

 2 (Jason Aldean, Brooks & Dunn)

Nominations
 6 (Luke Bryan); 4 (Florida Georgia Line); 3 (Sam Hunt); 2 (Jason Aldean, Brooks & Dunn, Lady Antebellum, Blake Shelton)

References

Billboard awards